Merpati Nusantara Airlines Flight 5601 (MNA5601/MZ5601) was a domestic scheduled passenger flight, that departed Achmad Yani International Airport, Semarang, Indonesia bound for Husein Sastranegara International Airport, Bandung, Indonesia. On 18 October 1992, the two-year-old CASA/IPTN CN-235-10 was on approach to Bandung when it crashed into the side of Mount Puntang, near Mount Papandayan, West Java, Indonesia at 1:30 pm in bad weather. The aircraft exploded on impact killing all twenty seven passengers and four crew on board.

Flight 5601 is the worst ever civilian aviation disaster involving a CASA/IPTN CN-235, the deadliest in the company's history, the deadliest in Garut history, and the second deadliest aviation accident in Indonesia in 1992, after a plane flew into a mountain in eastern Indonesia which claimed 70 lives. It was also the deadliest plane crash involving an Indonesian aircraft. At the time of the incident it was the deadliest aviation accident in West Java, which later surpassed in 2012 when a Sukhoi Superjet 100 crashed into Mount Salak killing 45 people.

The crash sparked large controversy and trust issue in every Indonesian built aircraft. As because the plane was produced and designed by Bacharudin Jusuf Habibie, a former Indonesian president which at the time hold as State Minister of Science and Technology. He denied that the cause of the accident was because of design flaw and defense himself on the claim. Indonesian investigator team, the National Transportation Safety Committee confirmed that the cause of the crash wasn't because of design flaw, but due to pilot error aggravated by bad weather condition.

Flight
The plane was on approach to Husein Sastranegara Airport in Bandung, carrying twenty seven passengers and four crews. The Captain, a female, 29 years old Fierda Basaria Panggabean made first contact to Jakarta control tower in Soekarno-Hatta International Airport in Cengkareng informing the tower about the flight.
Flight 5601:"Merpati five six zero one. We are from Semarang"
Sumardi, the person in charge in ACO (Approach Control Office), told Flight 5601 that the weather in Bandung wasn't in very good condition with moderate precipitation and some thunder.
ATC:"Merpati five six zero one, maintain one two five"
Fierda already asked Jakarta Control Tower about the descent. Fierda decided to do a visual approach to the airport. Sumardi, the ACO, told Fierda to contact the tower if she has seen the runway, and so Fierda agreed.

But the contact never made by the aircraft, the aircraft lost contact and disappeared from Jakarta's radar. The plane went missing over the mountain. Search and rescue team was assembled by the National Search and Rescue Agency, consisting of Cisurupan military, one platoon from Yon 303 Cikajang Garut, Garut police and National Air Force Army consisting of ten people. Local residents and villagers also helping the operation.

The plane was later discovered to be "disintegrated" in what onlookers described it as "totally incinerated". The tail and one of the propellers was the only parts left intact from the impact. Fierda's body was found still gripping the yoke of the plane and made a nose up input. The wreckage of the plane was found to be in climbing position, possibly Fierda didn't realise that the plane would impacted terrain until the last moment, when the terrain was seen by her, she initiated a pull-up which was too late. None of the twenty seven passengers and crews made out alive. Body parts were strewn over the area. A baby was found  from the wreckage, with its legs had been burnt out due to post-impact fire. A child body, nine years old Meka Fitriyani, was found in her mother's arm. Most of the bodies were found in burn condition and large burn injuries due to post-impact fire. As the plane crashed, the fuel ignited and exploded causing massive fire in the crash site. The post-fire was so intense in fact it burns the vegetations in the surrounding area and ignited some bush fire. The wreckage was still smoking when it was founded by authorities and remained smoking even on Monday dusk. The plane's wreckage was strewn over small area and situated in mountainous terrain, which is surrounded by two steep hills. This causing difficulties in order to retrieve the bodies. Therefore, the evacuation process proceed by foot. It took three hours to reach the crash site.
On Monday dusk, one day after the crash, around twenty seven bodies had been found and recovered by authorities. Eight of them had been identified including the body of the co-pilot, First Officer Adnan S. Paago. The bodies then transported to local regional hospital in Garut, the Guntur regional hospital. It would be stored and later transported to Hasan Sadikin Hospital in Bandung for repatriation. The evacuation process was observed and monitored by at the time Transportation Minister Azwar Anas and Garut's mayor Momon Gandasasmita.

Passengers and crews
The aircraft was carrying thirty one passengers and crews, consisted of twenty seven passengers and four crew members. All of them were Indonesian. The Captain was 29 years old Fierda Basaria Panggabean. She had logged in 6.000 hours of flight experience. The co-pilot was First Officer Adnan S. Paago from Jakarta. Cabin crew members were Rita Rusliati and Ketty. Most passengers were travelling from Semarang. Some of them reside in Tangerang, Jakarta and parts of West Java.

Aircraft
Flight 5601 was using a CN235. CN235 rolled out on September 1983 which attended by President Soeharto and named by him as Tetuko, Gatotkaca's childhood name. CN235 was manufactured by joint venture of Indonesian aviation company Indonesian Aerospace in Bandung and Spain's CASA. The engines and the avionics instruments were not manufactured by Indonesia, while everything else were made in Indonesia. The cockpit, nose, and inner wing were produced by Spain, while the outer wing and the tail section were manufactured by Indonesia. Both sides have fair shares.

Investigation
Before investigators started analysis of the black box from the crash site, the Captain of the plane, Fierda Basaria, was the first one to blame as the cause of the accident. As such, this angered her father, Wilson. Wilson stated that the public shouldn't blame his daughter as she was the Captain of the ill-fated flight, and blamed the Minister of Research and Technology BJ Habibie. Because Habibie was the designer and also the producer of the CN235 aircraft, Wilson directly blamed that BJ Habibie made several mistakes in his design, indicating a design flaw in the aircraft.

However, BJ Habibie instantly denied that a flaw was found in the aircraft. He insisted that the aircraft was 'airworthy' and had taken several tests to prove it. In the latter, he blamed Captain Fierda Basaria as the cause of the crash, as the black box analysis indicated that the main cause of the crash was because Fierda's action. Radar data retrieved from the control tower supported this theory, and concluded that she followed the wrong procedure. Outraged, Wilson plans to sue Indonesian Aerospace via his lawyer. His lawyer ready to sued the manufacturer, as he claimed that they had 'damaged the images of Fierda Basaria' and insisted that their plane was 'rain-proof' and 'thunder-proof'.

Analysis from the crash site proved that Flight 5601 didn't follow its assigned route. Head Staff of Search and Rescue Operation Lieutenant Colonel Iut Wiandra said Flight 5601 encountered thick clouds, leaving the crew with two options: turning to the left or the right while flying over the side of the cloud. Fierda chose to fly to the left, heading to the south, towards Garut. Fierda's cautious action proved fatal. The thick clouds that Flight 5601 attempted to avoid would intercept the aircraft. Weather reports received from Husein Tower stated that the weather on the route that Fierda use was in bad condition, with cumulonimbus clouds spotted and heavy thunder in the sky.

He stated that if she wanted a safe flight, she should have stayed with the Instrument Flight Rules (IFR). Later on they were allowed to continue their approach in Visual Flight Rules.

Indeed, Fierda disobeyed the rules. Shockingly, a technician from Husein Tower revealed that most pilots that fly in the route always did the same as Fierda, and said that they always do this until the accident because nothing ever happened to them. This time Fierda was unlucky, and in this situation she was at fault, since it was not easy to change her way to fly. According to Frans Sumolang, Former Director of Merpati, when a plane follows VFR, it should stay in VFR. Changing from VFR to IFR could cause errors in the navigation calculations. Moreover, to change back to IFR, Flight 5601 needs to climb  first.

A pilot claimed that the aircraft involved in the accident, CN235, was an easy-to-control plane and well equipped. He stated that the aircraft was equipped with an instrument navigation model EFIS ( Electronics Flight Integrated System) with a large screen in the cockpit. Most indicators on the plane, including the altitude, speed and their position could be seen on the screen. If one of the indicators malfunctioned, a backup indicator could be used by the pilots.

Communication problems in-flight 
There were speculations that the communication in Flight 5601 wasn't functiong properly. This theory surfaced because in the last 10–15 minutes of the tragedy, Flight 5601 didn't make any contact with Husein Tower nor with Soekarno-Hatta Tower. This was immediately denied by the technician in Husein Tower. He stated that while in VFR, most pilots were "having fun" with their job and most likely didn't want to talk with control tower, except if an emergency occurred.

Mid-air engine failure
A mid-air engine failure could have occurred in Flight 5601. This was what Fierda's family thought to the cause of the crash. Based on its direction and travel time, Iut Wiandra from BASARNAS forecasted that Flight 5601 were cruising in 120 knots, far beyond the normal 180 knots.

Robert Ropolewski from Aviation Week published their main report of CN235 on 27 April 1987. He spoke highly of the aircraft's quality. In his statement, he stated that the aircraft was safe, comfortable, and charming. However, rumors spread that the plane he was using was a CN235 from Spain. BJ Habibie later answered it with ease and stated that both CN235, either from Indonesia or Spain, have the same performance level.

If its speed were pushed for over 215 knots, the plane would shake. Fierda had double engine failure before the accident. First in Ngurah Rai International Airport and the second one in Halim Perdana Kusuma Airport. On the last one, one of its engine failed just shortly after takeoff. Fierda turned back to Halim and landed safely. Subandoro also claimed that he had an engine trouble once and landed safely.

Fatal mechanical failure
Another pilot stated that the flaps in CN235 were not functioning properly. Flaps, which were used to generate lift, didn't work in optimum condition. Thus, most of the pilots should maintain a high speed while landing, which was very dangerous. As such, the aircraft needs a runway over 1 km long. They didn't have a choice. If they maintain a low speed, the plane would enter a stall condition.

In Merpati Nusantara Airlines, the aircraft, CN235 had a bad reputation. Aircraft spareparts delay often occurred. This causing a chaotic operation management in Merpati. There was a CN235 that had a failure on its CTHS (Control Tork Holding System).  This component was produced in Spain, and its cover was produced in Bandung, Indonesia. In order to get the spareparts that they need, Merpati needs to wait for 6 months. If the spareparts delivered right away, in just two days the plane could go fly again to the sky. Because of this Merpati only operates 8 of its CN235, while the rest were claimed to be the 'backup'.

However, the head of Merpati stated that the spareparts delay and the tragedy of Flight 5601 was totally different and stated that if the plane was flying at the time, the plane was airworthy.

Bad weather

There was another speculation that actually stated that Fierda's deliberately decreased her speed to 'soften' turbulence that had occurred on Flight 5601. Another thing was that the wreckage of the plane was found at an altitude of  meaning that it was quite impossible that Fierda decreased her altitude that low and hard to prove. The incident happened in a mountain with a thick fog, and sudden updraft and downdraft could occurred any moment in the mountain. It was suspected that Flight 5601 was struck by a downdraft which caused her altitude to decreased a few hundred meters. But so far, not a single evidence found.

Aftermath
After the crash, a memorial was erected by Garut Government to remember the accident. The surviving propellers from Flight 5601 was evacuated and placed in front of the city hall of Garut, remembering all victims of the tragedy in Mount Puntang.

See also

Air China Flight 129
Asiana Airlines Flight 214
List of accidents and incidents involving airliners by airline

References

External links

Aviation accidents and incidents in 1992
Aviation accidents and incidents in Indonesia
Accidents and incidents involving the CASA CN-235
Airliner accidents and incidents involving controlled flight into terrain
1992 in Indonesia
October 1992 events in Asia